The Federal Correctional Institution, Fairton (FCI Fairton) is a Medium-security United States federal prison for male inmates in New Jersey. It is operated by the Federal Bureau of Prisons, a division of the United States Department of Justice. The facility also has an adjacent satellite prison camp housing minimum-security male offenders.

Notable incidents
On August 17, 2010, Brian Walters, Chief Pharmacist at FCI Fairton, pleaded guilty to stealing over $7,000 in drugs and supplies from the prison pharmacy which he supervised. An investigation revealed that from July 2008 to July 2009, Walters stole the drug nalbuphine hydrochloride, an opiate-based pain reliever, and other supplies, including hypodermic needles. Walters also ordered extra quantities of the drug through his position as Chief Pharmacist and took the drug and supplies in order to use the drug himself. The stolen drugs and needles were worth over $7,000. He was sentenced on December 1, 2010, to a three-year term of probation, $7,041.44 in restitution and a $1,000 fine.

An FBI investigation in early 2012 found that FCI Fairton Correction Officer Job Brown, 39, accepted $3,600 in bribes in exchange for smuggling contraband in and out of the facility. Between January 2012 and March 14, 2012, he accepted two separate cash payments – $1,100 and $2,500 – in exchange for using his position to smuggle tobacco and vitamin supplements to a prisoner inside the facility. Brown also smuggled approximately 900 U.S. postage stamps out of the facility for the same inmate's benefit. Tobacco is prohibited at FCI Fairton, and inmates are also not allowed to possess more than 60 United States postage stamps, or vitamin supplements, which are not purchased through the prison commissary. Brown pleaded guilty to accepting bribes in June 2012 and was sentenced to one year in prison.

Notable inmates

See also

List of U.S. federal prisons
Incarceration in the United States

References 

Buildings and structures in Cumberland County, New Jersey
Prisons in New Jersey
Fairton